Morfill is a surname. Notable people with the surname include: 

Gregor Morfill (born 1945), German physicist
William Morfill (1834–1909), first professor of Russian in the UK